Annajma is a Libyan football club based in Benghazi which plays in the Libyan Premier League.

Annajma
1943 establishments in Libya
Association football clubs established in 1943